Pseudergolis is a butterfly genus from the family Nymphalidae found in Southeast Asia. Some authorities place it in the subfamily Cyrestinae.

Species
Listed alphabetically.
Pseudergolis avesta C. & R. Felder, [1867] – Sulawesi Tabby
Pseudergolis wedah  (Kollar, 1848) – Tabby

References

Pseudergolinae
Nymphalidae genera